Thalion may refer to:
 Húrin Thalion, a Tolkien character
 Thalion (band), a Brazilian metal band
 Thalion Software, a computer game company
 Thalion Technologies, software company

See also 
 Talion (disambiguation)
 Thallium, a chemical element